Black Baron may refer to:

People nicknamed Black Baron
 Benoît de Bonvoisin (born 1939), Belgian baron and politician. 
 Chris Pile (programmer) (born 1969), British programmer and computer criminal
 Terry Funk (born 1944), American pro wrestler whose ring name is Black Baron
 Michael Wittman (1914–1944), a German Waffen-SS commander 
 Roman von Ungern-Sternberg (1885–1921), Russian anticommunist general in the Russian Civil War and later warlord in Mongolia
 Pyotr Nikolayevich Wrangel (1878–1928), Russian White Army commander
 Robert Munro, 18th Baron of Foulis (died 1633), Scottish soldier of fortune
 Hugh Rose of Kilravock, the tenth Laird of the Highland Scottish Clan Rose

Arts, entertainment, and media
The Black Barons, a Swiss country-folk music band
 Black Baron, a character in the Sly Cooper video game series
 The Black Baron, a character in the Overlord: Dark Legend video game
 Black Baron, a character in the French TV series Super 4
 Black Baron, a member of the vampire race in Marvel Comics
 Black Baron, a character from the 2010 Wii game MadWorld

Other uses
 Birmingham Black Barons, Negro leagues baseball team, Birmingham, Alabama, 1920–1960
 Black Baron, Pennsylvania, in Lancaster County, Pennsylvania
 Black Barons (book), a novel by Miloslav Svandrlik
 Black Barons, Special Designation for the 18th Aviation Brigade (United States)

See also
 Black baronets, two baronetcies created for persons with the surname Black
 Black Barony, a historic house at Eddleston in the Scottish Borders
 Red Baron (disambiguation)

Nicknames
Nicknames of politicians
Nicknames in crime
Nicknames in sports